PLF may stand for:

Science and technology
 Payload fairing
 Plant Load Factor

Organisations
 Pacific Legal Foundation
 Pakistan Labour Federation
 Palestinian Liberation Front
 Patrick Leigh Fermor
 Phil Lesh and Friends
 Popular Liberation Forces
 Pretty Lights Family
 The Princess Louise Fusiliers

Transport
 Pala Airport, Chad (by IATA code)
 Passenger load factor
 Passenger locator form

Law
 Peters, LaPlaca and Fuste

Other
 Central Malayo-Polynesian languages (by ISO 639 code)
 Parachute landing fall
 Precision livestock farming